On 27 September 1967, the national association football teams of Japan and the Philippines faced each other in a qualification match for the 1968 Summer Olympics. The teams were in Group 1, where South Korea, Lebanon, South Vietnam and Taiwan (Republic of China)  were also included. The top team in the group qualified for the Olympics. This match resulted in Japan's largest victory and the Philippines' worst defeat in an international football match. The Philippines' previous record for its worst defeat was 1–15 against Malaysia at the 1962 Asian Games. Japan also suffered its worst defeat to the Philippines with the score 2–15 on 10 May 1917, but that is not recognized as an official international match by the Japan Football Association.

Details

Final standings
Japan won all its other matches with other teams in the group except with South Korea which ended with a draw. The Philippines failed to win any matches in the whole duration of the qualifying tournament. The Philippines also conceded two other defeats with the opposing sides scoring two-digit goal difference. The matches were against South Vietnam; 10–0, and Lebanon; 11–1. South Vietnam's match with the Philippines was its largest victory in an international football match. Lebanon's result was also its largest victory in an international football match. Japan managed to qualify for the Football event at the 1968 Summer Olympics.

References

Record association football wins
1967 in Asian football
Japan national football team matches
Philippines national football team matches
Phil
May 1967 sports events in Asia
1967 in Tokyo